Midland-Odessa Sockers FC is an American soccer team based in Midland, Texas, United States. Founded in 2008, the team plays in the National Premier Soccer League (NPSL), the fourth tier of the American Soccer Pyramid, in the Lone Star Conference of the South Region.

The team has played its home games at the Grande Communications Stadium since 2009. The team's colors are white and navy blue.

Two of the team's co-owners, Miles Prentice and Bob Richmond, are also the owners of the Midland RockHounds Double-A Minor League Baseball team. They have won three titles.

History
The team joined the USL as an expansion team in 2009, and opened its inaugural season Friday, April 10, 2009 with a 1–0 win over the Arizona Sahuaros in an exhibition match at Grande Stadium. The Sockers played their first official game on May 2, 2009, a 2–0 loss to the El Paso Patriots.

Originally known as the West Texas Sockers, they were renamed the Odessa/Midland Sockers on February 20, 2013.  The club was again renamed, this time to "Midland-Odessa FC", upon their entry into NPSL on December 13, 2016. The team adopted Midland-Odessa Sockers FC as its branding for the 2018 NPSL season.

Players

Notable former players
This list of notable former players comprises players who went on to play professional soccer after playing for the team in the Premier Development League, or those who previously played professionally before joining the team.

  Ben Everson
  Alonso Jiménez
  James Stevens
  Andrew Fox
  Walker Hume
  Tucker Hume

Year-by-year

Head coaches
  Jesus Enriquez (2009–2010)
  Warren Cottle (2010–2013)
  Matt Barnes (2014–2017)
  Luis Rincon (2018)
  Johnny Clifford (2019)
  Dave Jacobs (2020–present)

Stadium
 Grande Communications Stadium; Midland, Texas (2009–present)

Average attendance
Attendance stats are calculated by averaging each team's self-reported home attendances from the historical match archive at https://web.archive.org/web/20100105175057/http://www.uslsoccer.com/history/index_E.html.

 2009: 2,782 (2nd in PDL)
 2010: 2,501 (2nd in PDL)

References

http://www.goeasternathletics.com/roster.aspx?rp_id=10666&path=msoc

External links

 
Official PDL site

Defunct Premier Development League teams
Soccer clubs in Texas
Association football clubs established in 2008
2008 establishments in Texas
National Premier Soccer League teams
Sports in Midland, Texas